Oudeschans is a small village with a population of around 100 in the municipality of Westerwolde in the province of Groningen in the Netherlands. The 16th-century fortification is now a state protected village area with several national heritage sites, among which a 17th-century garrison church, and the Vestingmuseum Oudeschans.

Etymology 
The fortification was initially named Bellingwolderschans, meaning Sconce of Bellingwolde, in 1593. It was renamed Oudeschans, meaning Old Sconce, after the fortification of Nieuweschans, meaning New Sconce, was built in 1628.

History 
In 1593, during the Eighty Years' War, the fortification was built by William Louis, Count of Nassau-Dillenburg to strengthen the strategically important Bellingwolderzijl (Sluice of Bellingwolde) connecting the river Westerwoldsche Aa to the Dollart. The fortification was used for military purposes until 1814.

In the 1980s, some of the walls, canals, and bastions were restored. In 1991, the fortification became a state protected village area.

Geography 
Oudeschans is located at  (53.14, 7.14) in the north of the municipality of Westerwolde, in the east of the province of Groningen, in the northeast of the Netherlands. The village is in the southeast of the region Oldambt, situated between the river Westerwoldse Aa in the west and the canal B.L. Tijdenskanaal in the east.

The nearest village is Bellingwolde to the southeast and the nearest city is Winschoten to the west. Other nearby villages are Beerta in the northwest, Bad Nieuweschans in the northeast, Vriescheloo in the south, and Blijham in the southwest.

Oudeschans is an administrative neighborhood in the district of Bellingwolde.

Demographics 

Attractions 
The 17th-century garrison church, walls, canal, bastions, and several other buildings are state monuments.

Vestingmuseum Oudeschans is a local museum about the history of the fortification of Oudeschans with a display of archaeological findings from the 17th and 18th centuries.

References

External links 

  Oudeschans on the municipal website

Star forts
Forts in the Netherlands
Populated places in Groningen (province)
Westerwolde (municipality)